Folliott is a surname. Notable people with the surname include:

Francis Folliott (1667–1701), Irish politician
John Folliott (disambiguation), multiple people
Henry Folliott (disambiguation), multiple people
 Scott Folliott, fictional character in Foreign Correspondent (film)

See also
Baron Folliott